Difference is the third album of the Finnish power metal band Dreamtale released on 25 April 2005 on Spinefarm Records. It was also released in Japan. It features on vocals for the first time in the band Jarkko Ahola of the band Teräsbetoni.

Track listing
"Lost Souls" (3:12)
"Wings of Icaros" (4:54)
"New Life" (4:50)
"Lucid Times" (7:31)
"Mirror" (3:28)
"World's Child" (3:57)
"Sail Away" (3:46)
"Fly" (4:07)
"Secret Door" (3:55)
"We Are One" (4:18)
"Green Fields" (3:11)
"Powerplay" (4:15) (bonus in Japanese release)

Personnel
Jarkko Ahola – vocals
Rami Keränen – guitar
Esa Orjatsalo – guitar
Turkka Vuorinen – keyboards
Pasi Ristolainen – bass
Pete Rosenbom – drums

References

2005 albums
Dreamtale albums
Spinefarm Records albums